Kenneth Wayne Natt (born October 5, 1958) is an American former professional basketball player and ex-interim head coach for the National Basketball Association's Sacramento Kings. He was a 6'3"  guard and played collegiately at Northeast Louisiana University (now the University of Louisiana-Monroe) and had a three-year NBA playing career. After serving as an assistant with the Cleveland Cavaliers from 2004 to 2007, Natt was named to the coaching staff of newly appointed Kings head coach and former Kansas City Kings teammate Reggie Theus in 2007. He was subsequently named interim head coach on the firing of Theus, but he himself was fired on April 24, 2009, after the Kings finished with an NBA season-low 17 wins.

Professional playing career
Natt was selected with the 7th pick of the second round (30th overall) in the 1980 NBA draft by the Indiana Pacers. He played for three different teams until the 1984–85 season.

Outside of his NBA career, he played for seven total teams in the CBA and the WBL.

Coaching career
Natt began his coaching career in 1994 as an assistant coach at Youngstown State University. Natt then worked as a scout for the Utah Jazz for one season under Jerry Sloan before being an assistant on Sloan's staff from 1996 to 2004. After that, Natt joined the Cleveland Cavaliers' coaching staff in 2004. He has also coached in the CBA and the Canadian NBL with the Cape Breton Breakers, and worked as an assistant coach at Youngstown State University and as a player scout for the Jazz and for the WBL. In 2011, he became the head coach of the India national basketball team. Since 2012, Natt has been director of basketball at the IMG Academy.

In 2003, Kenny Natt was inducted into the University of Louisiana at Monroe (ULM) Hall of Fame. He is the younger brother of former NBA All-Star Calvin Natt.

Head coaching record

|-
| style="text-align:left;"|Sacramento
| style="text-align:left;"|
|58||11||47|||| style="text-align:center;"|5th in Pacific||—||—||—||—
| style="text-align:center;"|—
|- class="sortbottom"
| align="center" colspan="2"|Career
|58||11||47|||| ||—||—||—||—

References

External links
 Kenny Natt coaching profile at NBA.com
 

1958 births
Living people
African-American basketball coaches
African-American basketball players
Albany Patroons players
Alberta Dusters players
Albuquerque Silvers players
American expatriate basketball people in Canada
American expatriate basketball people in India
American men's basketball players
Basketball coaches from Louisiana
Basketball players from Louisiana
Cleveland Cavaliers assistant coaches
Continental Basketball Association coaches
Indiana Pacers draft picks
Indiana Pacers players
Kansas City Kings players
Lancaster Lightning players
Las Vegas Silvers players
Louisiana–Monroe Warhawks men's basketball players
Point guards
Rockford Lightning players
Sacramento Kings assistant coaches
Sacramento Kings head coaches
Shooting guards
Sportspeople from Monroe, Louisiana
Utah Jazz assistant coaches
Utah Jazz players
Wyoming Wildcatters players
Youngstown State Penguins men's basketball coaches
21st-century African-American people
20th-century African-American sportspeople